The ABC Gnat was a 45 hp (34 kW) two-cylinder aero engine designed by British engineer Granville Bradshaw for use in light aircraft. The Gnat was built by ABC Motors, first running in 1916, production ceased in December 1918. 17 engines were built from an original order of 18.

Applications
BAT Crow
Blackburn Sidecar
Eastchurch Kitten
Grain Kitten
Loening M-2 Kitten
Macchi M.16G
Royal Flying Corps ‘Aerial Target’
Sopwith Sparrow
Sopwith Tadpole

Specifications (Gnat I)

See also

References

Notes

Bibliography

 Lumsden, Alec. British Piston Engines and their Aircraft. Marlborough, Wiltshire: Airlife Publishing, 2003. .

External links

1910s aircraft piston engines
Gnat